While is an English word indicating duration or simultaneity.

While may also refer to:
 Chris While (born 1956), British singer-songwriter
 Kellie While (born 1976), British singer-songwriter
 While loop in computer programming

See also
 Wile (disambiguation)